Drug education is the planned provision of information, guidelines, resources, and skills relevant to living in a world where psychoactive substances are widely available and commonly used for a variety of both medical and non-medical purposes, some of which may lead to harms such as overdose, injury, infectious disease (such as HIV or hepatitis C), or addiction.

Drug education campaigns and programs
Drug education can be given in numerous forms, some more effective than others. Examples include advertising and awareness raising campaigns such as the UK Government's FRANK campaign or the US "media campaign". In addition there are school based drug education programs like DARE or that currently being evaluated by the UK Blueprint Programme. In efforts to prevent substance abuse, drug education may perpetuate myths and stereotypes about psychoactive substances and people who use them.

Drug education can also take less explicit forms; an example of this is the Positive Futures Programme, funded by the UK government as part of its drug strategy. This programme uses sport and the arts as catalysts to engage young people on their own turf, putting them in contact with positive role models (coaches/trained youth workers). After building a trusting relationship with a young person, these role models can gradually change attitudes towards drug use and steer the young person back into education, training and employment. This approach reaches young people who have dropped out of mainstream education. It also has additional benefits for the community in reduced crime and anti-social behaviour.

School-based drug education 
School-based drug education began with the anti-alcohol "temperance education" programmes of the Woman's Christian Temperance Union in the United States and Canada in the late 19th century. In many respects, the WCTU's progressive education agenda set the template for much of what has been done since in the name of drug education.

Past research into drug education has indicated that to be effective it must involve engaging, interactive learning strategies that stimulate higher-order thinking, promote learning and be transferable to real life circumstances. Current challenges from this approach exist in adopting evidence-based school drug education programmes. Currently, in the majority of countries where preventive drug education programs and courses exist, they are established and funded by the Government. These education programs aim to educate adolescents about illicit drug use in an effort to prevent illegal drug use while highlighting the dangers of problematic substance use.

The Australian Government has implemented a range of drug education programs through the National Drug Education Strategy (NDES) by providing schools with effective drug education programmes. The program aims  to manage drug related issues and incidents within schools.

On 6 December 2015 the Australian Government Department of Health launched the Positive Choices portal as part of its response to the findings from the National Ice Taskforce report. Positive Choices is an online portal that facilitates access to interactive evidence-based drug education resources and prevention programs for school communities. Positive Choices builds on existing drug education resources developed by researchers at the National Drug and Alcohol Research Centre such as the Climate Schools programs that have been proven to reduce alcohol and drug related harms and increase student well-being.

The Australian Department of Health and Aging identified that analgesics (90%), alcohol (80–90%) and tobacco (30–60%) were the most widely utilised substances among adolescents. In addition to this, cannabis was another commonly used illicit substance that accounted for 33% usage among adolescents aged 14–17 years.

In addition, to government-funded programs, a number of not-for-profit organisations (such as Life Education Australia also provide drug education programs to adolescents. These preventative programs aim to deliver a progressive approach that will motivate and encourage young people to make positive decisions in life. Emphasis within these programs is also placed in focusing on deterring peer pressure as a means of empowering adolescents and promoting autonomy. This approach reaches 750,000 primary and secondary students in Australia each year.

D.A.R.E. 

D.A.R.E. (Drug Abuse Resistance Education) is a program in the United States implemented in 5th grade school classrooms to educate students on the effects of drugs and temptations they may encounter, particularly in later education. The police officers who administer the program can also serve as community models for students. However, there is no scientific evidence that preventive drug education, such as D.A.R.E., is effective.

Technology and drug education 
The University of North Carolina Greensboro has researched the drug prevention program, All Stars, Sr. The program is developing education through technology (videos), so that health education programs could reach schools in rural communities. The technology programs would provide drug/ health education in general with qualified instructors, in areas that do not have programs.

Effectiveness
Recent studies have identified that a gap between the theory of education programmes and the implementation exists. This is regards to the collaborative learning approach and difficulties with teachers adopting these interactive drug education programmes. The practical implications of these findings are that professional training and support are required to increase the effectiveness of teaching staff, and the uniform implementation of drug curriculum. Additional drug education research in the future should acknowledge the complexities of implementing these programmes in a school environment. Furthermore, additional support for teachers, counselors, school administrators and other education professionals should be integrated as a means of being realistic about what constitutes effective drug education and maintaining a high quality standard.

An article in the Journal of Child & Adolescent Substance Abuse ran a study on two southern California high schools in middle class suburbs, and the high school students' use of anabolic-androgenic steroids. It surveyed students on if they use steroids, knew the side effects of steroids, and additionally their use of other prevalent drugs. The article specifically found that male students that were athletes were more likely to use steroids than students that are female or non-athlete students in general. Most students that participated in steroids played the sports, football or soccer, and were most likely to do steroids if they participated in both sports. Professional sports, influence young athletes, and when professional athletes participate in drugs, it can lead young adults to use drugs without realizing the side effects and consequences that come along with drug use.

Also, a study in the journal of Drugs: Education, Prevention & Policy discusses alcohol and drug prevention programs in Australia for students in grades 8 and 9. It goes into detail about the student's between 13 and 15 years old, to see if alcohol and drug prevention programs have an actual effect on preventing substance abuse. The study comes to the conclusion that when the students went through a drug and alcohol prevention program, they were less likely to develop a drug or alcohol problem.

See also
 Alcohol education
 Responsible drug use

References

External links

Blueprint
Drug Education Forum
Positive Futures Programme
Talk to Frank
Positive Choices Drug Education portal
Climate Schools Australia

Education by subject
Psychoactive drugs